Adrienne Arsenault is a Canadian journalist who is the Chief Correspondent of CBC News and co-anchor of The National since November 2017.

Arsenault joined the CBC in 1991, as an editorial assistant and night assignment editor for CBC Toronto.  She has had numerous other positions with the CBC. She spent three years as the foreign correspondent in Jerusalem. In 2006, she succeeded Don Murray as the chief London correspondent.

In 2008, she was part of a small group of Western reporters who were allowed into Zimbabwe to report on that year's election in the country.

Awards
She was named the Commonwealth Broadcasting Association's journalist of the year for 2005.

Arsenault has won two Gemini Awards, in 2008, in the categories of Best Reportage and in Best News Magazine Segment and nominated for five Gemini Awards, for her work on The National, including a segment called Healing Hikkaduwa. She has won awards from the American Society of Professional Journalists, the Radio and Television News Directors Association, and the New York and Columbus festivals.

In September 2015, she was Senior Correspondent on a team that won the News & Documentary Emmy Award for her coverage of the Ebola virus epidemic in Liberia.

She won the Canadian Screen Award for Best Host or Interviewer in a News or Information Program or Series at the 7th Canadian Screen Awards in 2019.

Background
Born and raised in Toronto, Arsenault is the daughter of Ray Arsenault (1929-2006), a Canadian television director whose credits included King of Kensington and Hockey Night in Canada, and Bette Arsenault.

In 1986, Arsenault graduated from St. Clement's School as Head Girl, the University of Western Ontario with a BA in 1990 and an MA in Journalism in 1991. While at Western, Arsenault developed her interest in broadcasting at CHRW-FM.

References

Related Media
 CBC biography
 
 

Canadian television reporters and correspondents
International Emmy Award winners
Journalists from Toronto
Franco-Ontarian people
University of Western Ontario alumni
Canadian people of French descent
Canadian women television journalists
Living people
CBC Television people
Canadian television news anchors
20th-century Canadian journalists
21st-century Canadian journalists
Canadian Screen Award winning journalists
1967 births
20th-century Canadian women